Devil's Peak is a peak in Sai Kung District, Hong Kong. The communities of Tiu Keng Leng, Lei Yue Mun and Yau Tong surround this peak. 

The area around the peak was garrisoned by the British Army in the 20th century and prior to that, by local pirates in the 19th century to control the passage of Lei Yue Mun, an important nautical passage that leads to Victoria Harbour.

Geography
Devil's Peak stands at 222 metres in height. To the east of the peak lies Junk Bay Chinese Permanent Cemetery and Yau Tong lies to its west. The hill extends its ridge south to water in Lei Yue Mun and north to another peak called Chiu Keng Wan Shan. 

Section 3 of The Wilson Trail runs through the foot of Devil's Peak and can be reached from Tiu Keng Leng or Yau Tong via cemetery roads.

Military history
The major parts of the military sites on Devil's Peak were built between 1900 and 1914. The remnants of a redoubt and batteries are still visible on the peak. The four main clusters of military structures that remain are:
 Devil's Peak Redoubt, which stands on the summit at a level of 222m. It was built in 1914.
 A small site at 196m
 Gough Battery - upper battery at 160m, was built in 1898 with 2 6-inch guns; one later replaced by 9.2-inch guns; guns removed in 1936 to Stanley Fort; likely named for former Commander-in-Chief of British Forces in China Hugh Gough, 1st Viscount Gough
 Pottinger Battery - lower battery at 81m, with 9.2-inch guns; guns removed in 1936 to Bokhara Battery, Cape D'Aguilar; named for Governor Sir Henry Pottinger

A list of troops whom were stationed here (mainly during World War II):
 5/7 Rajput Regiment
 1st Mountain Battery of the Hong Kong Singapore Battalion of the Royal Artillery

See also

 Battle of Hong Kong
 List of mountains, peaks and hills in Hong Kong
 Black Hill, Hong Kong
 Chiu Keng Wan Shan
 Wilson Trail

References

External links

 Batteries on Devil's Peak 
 
 
 Facilities Management and Planning for Heritage Sites: Lessons Learnt From a Pilot Study on Disused Military Sites
 Fun in Kwun Tong - Devil's Peak Batteries

Forts in Hong Kong
World War II sites in Hong Kong
Mountains, peaks and hills of Hong Kong